Labidostomma is a genus of mites belonging to the family Labidostommatidae. The bodies of these mites are covered in a reticulated pattern.

Species
Species include:

Labidostomma absoloni
Labidostomma aethiopica
Labidostomma angolensis
Labidostomma cornutum
Labidostomma corsicum
Labidostomma denticulatum
Labidostomma fictiluteum
Labidostomma fissurata
Labidostomma franzi
Labidostomma guadelupense
Labidostomma hoegi
Labidostomma integrum
Labidostomma jaquemarti
Labidostomma legendrei
Labidostomma longipes
Labidostomma luteoides
Labidostomma luteum
Labidostomma mirax
Labidostomma motasi
Labidostomma perciliata
Labidostomma peruviana
Labidostomma repetitor
Labidostomma vialeae
Labidostomma virescens
Labidostomma zangherii

References
Partial species list
New species of mites of the families Tydeidae and Labidostommidae (Acarina: Prostigmata) collected from South African plants Magdelena K.P. Meyer & P.A.J. Ryke Acarologia vol I

Trombidiformes